Albert Jordens (24 February 1902 – 23 December 1949) was a Belgian racing cyclist. He rode in the 1925 Tour de France.

References

1902 births
1949 deaths
Belgian male cyclists
Place of birth missing